Zoe Tay (born 10 January 1968) is a Singaporean actress and former model. She has been referred to as the "Queen of Caldecott Hill" and "Ah Jie" (Top Actress) by the local media since the rise of her popularity in the 1990s. She is one of the first batch of actors to receive the Star Awards All-Time Favourite Artiste award, along with Li Nanxing and Chew Chor Meng.

To date, Tay has received four Star Awards for Best Actress - a record for most number of wins in the category.

Early life 
Tay is the sixth of seven children born to Teochew parents. She was three when her biological mother died in an accident. Her father remarried and had a daughter with Wong Pong Chin. Her father worked at a pig farm in Lim Chu Kang while her stepmother was a housewife. Tay attended Kay Hua Primary School and later, Yuan Ching Secondary School, where she completed her O-level examinations. She studied fashion design at the Baharuddin Vocational Institute.

When she was 13, she thought of using "Jenny" as her English name as people pronounced her hanyu pinyin surname Zheng as "Jenny". However her siblings didn't like it. She later found the name "Zoe" in a dictionary.

Career 
Tay started out as a model at the age of 16. In 1987, she was named Model of The Year. After Tay was crowned champion of the inaugural Star Search in 1988, she was offered a 3-year contract with the Singapore Broadcasting Corporation (SBC), now known as MediaCorp. While Tay had initially disliked acting, she began feeling passionate for her craft after her role in Crime and Passion in 1991. Her breakthrough performance as a materialistic young woman in Pretty Faces catapulted her into stardom. Her popularity was affirmed with a Top 10 Most Popular Female Artiste Award at the Star Awards every year for ten consecutive years since its inception in 1994. In 1996, Zoe won the Best Actress award for her role in The Golden Pillow at the annual Star Awards.  In 2004, she was the first actress to have been awarded the prestigious All-Time Favourite Artiste. Zoe was the first female artiste to launch a coffee table book titled "Zoe's Coffee Table", commissioned by MediaCorp. 

Other than television series, Tay also forayed into films. In 2010, she starred opposite Hong Kong actor Kenny Ho in Love Cuts, playing the role of a terminally ill woman who has breast cancer. In 2013, she appeared in her first fully English-speaking role in Mister John with Irish star Aidan Gillen.

Tay has collaborated with many artistes in her various projects. Her on-screen chemistry with Li Nanxing in The Unbeatables and other serials has put them in the list of the Top 5 Best Onscreen Couples at the Star Awards 25th Drama Anniversary show. In 2015, she collaborated for the first time with Huang Biren, in The Dream Makers II.

Due to her contributions to the television industry in Singapore, a wax figurine was modelled after her by Madame Tussauds Singapore, and has been on display in the museum since 2014.

Tay won her second Best Actress at the Star Awards 2017 for You Can Be an Angel 2, 21 years after her first.

At the Star Awards 2021, Tay won her fourth Best Actress award for the drama, My Guardian Angels, becoming the first actress to win two consecutive Best Actress awards.

Personal life 
Tay is married to Philip Chionh, a former Republic of Singapore Air Force pilot. They were engaged in 1995 at the peak of her career, and held their wedding ceremony in 2001 at a church wedding and western-styled dinner at Ritz Carlton Hotel. They have 3 sons together: Brayden, Ashton and Nathan.

Filmography

Discography

Studio albums

Compilation albums

Awards and nominations

References

External links
 
  at Mediacorp
 
 Zoe Tay at Toggle

1968 births
Living people
20th-century Singaporean actresses
21st-century Singaporean actresses
Singaporean film actresses
Singaporean television actresses
Singaporean people of Teochew descent
Singaporean female models
20th-century Singaporean women singers
21st-century Singaporean women singers